One of the most popular sports in Liechtenstein is football. In Liechtenstein there is no national association football league however there are seven clubs in Liechtenstein which play in the Swiss football league system.

Men's national football team

In the qualification for the World Cup in Germany in 2006, they achieved two victories and two draws (2–2 against Portugal and 0–0 Slovakia). In the qualification for the EURO 2008 they gained seven points in a tough group with Spain, Sweden, Northern Ireland, Denmark, Latvia and Iceland.

Women's national football team

In 1985, almost no country in the world had a women's national football team, including Liechtenstein who did not have a team by 2006 on either the senior or youth level. The women's national team has never competed at the Women's World Cup nor entered the European Championship for Women. The team did not play in any FIFA sanctioned matches between 1970 and the present. In 2013, President of the Liechtenstein Football Association Matthias Voigt said he was committed towards working on the creation of a women's national team, and pointed to the activity level in the women's domestic competition.  Despite this comment, the federation had no staff dedicated to women's football by 2017 and also did not have a women's football committee.  Inclusion of women in governance was also limited, with only one woman serving on a committee and only 5 women serving in managerial positions within the organization. Progress on the development front as a result of activities by the LFV were part of the reason that Radio Liechtenstein cited in September 2017 the time to create a senior women's national team.

Liechtenstein's U16 and U18 girls' national teams have been in existence by 2017. UEFA listed the senior national women's side as a U19 B team.

Men's domestic football

Due to lack of active football teams, Liechtenstein is the only UEFA member nation not to have their own league and hence does not have any spots in the UEFA Champions League. Club sides play in the Swiss leagues, with FC Vaduz currently playing in the second highest Swiss division. Between 1934 and 1937, beside the Swiss Football Association, Liechtenstein's clubs were affiliates of St. Gallen Cantonal Football Association, where they had a tournament of Liechtenstein's clubs only, that determined the Liechtenstein's Champion. FC Triesen won the competition in 1934, 1935 and 1937. Since 1945, the tiny principality has had its own cup competition, the winners of which are guaranteed entry into the Europa Conference League qualification. 

FC Vaduz have become the dominant force within the Liechtenstein Football Cup, winning 15 of the last 16 competitions.

Mario Frick holds the record for most appearances and goals scored for Liechtenstein, and also played in football leagues around Europe.

However, it's still possible for the teams in Liechtenstein to participate the UEFA Champions League, but there is only one way in the current system. For example:
The Liechtenstein Football Cup champion wins the 2022–23 UEFA Europa Conference League.
Then, the team enters the 2023–24 UEFA Europa League.
Subsequently, if the club wins the 2023–24 UEFA Europa League.
Then, the team enters the 2024–25 UEFA Champions League.

Clubs

There are seven football teams in Liechtenstein:

Women's domestic football
Women's football officially began in the country in 1998, and faced a number of structural, population and geographic hurdles. Representatives from the country participated in a 2014 study group called "Women´s football in Iceland" as visitors. Their delegation was headed by Monika Burgmeier, along with top level women's club coaches Stefan Negele, Anton Kindle and Walter Vogt. Burgmeier presented a session called "Women’s football in Liechtenstein".  The following year, the Liechtenstein Football Association formally created a program to work towards the development of women's football in the country.  According to the Liechtenstein Football Association, this began to bear fruit in 2017.  In September 2017, as part of a program with FIFA, kits. safety equipment and training materials were provided to 200 girls in the country to encourage their participation in the sport.

Volleyball was the most popular women's sport in the country, with football ranking in the 6th or 7th most popular in the country. By 2017, football had supplanted volleyball as the most popular women's sport.  In 2006, there were 165 registered female players in the country.  This represented growth from 72 players in 2000. Liechtenstein Football Association was founded in 1934, and became affiliated with FIFA in 1976.  Less than 3% of the national federation's budget is earmarked for women's football, compared to 9% for men and 17% for youth.  There were 283 registered female players in 2016, with a decline in 2017 to 259 registered players.  61 of these players in 2017 were 18+, while 198 were youth players. The ratio of male to female coaches was 89:11 in 2017. 4 of these women coaches were UEFA B licence holders while another 4 were National C licence holders.  There was one qualified female referee in the country in 2017, and she only worked women's games. Girls played football in mixed groups as part of their organized school curriculum.

The women's version of sport had developed enough that there were two women's club sides, FC Ruggell and Triesen/Balzers who had played in Nationalliga B Women in Switzerland.  FC Ruggell was active in 2008 while Triesen/Balzers was active in 2014. Playing in Switzerland is the norm for most women's clubs in the country as a result of the size of their population and its location. There is also an active women's league supported by the Liechtenstein Football Association.  It had 4 teams in 2017.  The league was not professional, with all the players being domestic ones.  Average attendance at league matches was 30 people in 2017.

References